Szikszai or Szikszay is a surname. Notable people with the surname include:

Lajos Szikszai (1825–1897),  Hungarian revolutionary and politician
Réka Szikszay (born 1965), former professional tennis player from Hungary
Róbert Szikszai (born 1994), Hungarian athlete specialising in the discus throw

Hungarian-language surnames